Sharptown is an unincorporated community in Whitewater Township, Franklin County, Indiana.

History
Sharptown (historically called Sharpstown) was originally a post office on the Mt. Carmel and Johnson Fork Turnpike. The post office at Sharptown operated from 1878 until 1906.

Geography

References

Unincorporated communities in Franklin County, Indiana
Unincorporated communities in Indiana